Shi Wenbo (born 1950), is a Chinese billionaire businessman, chairman of Hengan International.

Early life 
In 1950, Shi was born in Quanzhou, Fujian province, China.

Career 
In 1985, Shi co-founded Hengan International with Xu Lianjie, and they produce sanitary napkins and baby diapers.

As of February 2016, Shi was listed as the 66th richest man in China by, Forbes who estimated his net worth at US $2.1 billion.

Philanthropy 
In 2010, Shi was ranked #13 in Top 20 Chinese Philanthropists of 2010. Shi's company donated $124.61 million yuan ($19.2M USD) to charity.

Personal life 
In 1975, Shi moved to Hong Kong. Shi has a son, Wong Kim Sze. As of 2020, he lives in Jinjiang, Fujian, China.

See also 
 One Foundation

References

External 
 Sze Man Bok at successstory.com
 Management Team at Hengan (image of Sze Man Bok)

1950 births
Living people
Billionaires from Fujian
Businesspeople from Fujian
People from Jinjiang, Fujian
Chinese company founders